Route 122 is a mostly East/West provincial highway in the Canadian province of New Brunswick. The road runs from Route 2 and Route 165 intersection in Dow Settlement. The road has a length of approximately 44 kilometres, and services small, otherwise isolated rural communities. In these areas, the highway is often unofficially referred to as "Main  Street."  The road bypasses several Lakes including Skiff Lake, Mud Lake, Eel River Lake, North Lake and finally Grand Lake before changing to Boundary Road in Orient, Maine at the Canada–United States border. The Highway is known as Canterbury Road between Meductic and Canterbury.

History

Route 122 was commissioned in 1965 as a renumbering of the former Route 26

Intersecting routes
 Begins with the continuation over Route 2 over exit 212 at Route 2 in Johnson Settlement
Connects to Route 630 in Canterbury
 Route 540 in Graham Corner
 Changes to Boundary Road at the US/Canada Border in Fosterville

River crossings
 None

Communities along the Route
Johnson Settlement
Dow Settlement
Canterbury
Skiff Lake
Eel River Lake
Graham Corner
Fosterville

See also
List of New Brunswick provincial highways

References

122
122